Carrion Colony is a novel by Australian author Richard King, published by Allen & Unwin. A reviewer in The Age called Carrion Colony an "altogether more ambitious work" than King's debut novel, Kindling Does for Firewood, a book which won Australia's Vogel Award in 1995. The reviewer calls Carrion Colony a "...kind of semi-allegorical, post-modernist account of the early days of colonial settlement, written in a highly idiosyncratic, jocularly vulgar style", almost as if it was "Australian history as viewed by Mad magazine." The reviewer states that "[t]ime and place are deliberately confused and conflated" and the prose is "...highly mannered", but with "arse jokes and puns aplenty". The reviewer states that the "...post-modernist element in the novel" can be seen in the "shifting sense of time and place but in the narrator's self-conscious intrusions". The reviewer calls it "willed, cerebral stuff". T

References

2002 Australian novels